Alberta Provincial Highway No. 56, commonly referred to as Highway 56, is a north-south highway in central Alberta, Canada.

History 

In the early 1990s, there was talk of extending Highway 56 from the Highway 1 to the US border.  This was due in large part to then Alberta Premier Don Getty, who at the time was also the MLA for Stettler. All talk of this endeavor stopped once Getty retired from politics and was succeeded as Premier by Ralph Klein.

Major intersections 
Starting from the south end of Highway 56:

References 

056
Drumheller